Miss República Dominicana 1992 was held on December 18, 1991. There were 22 candidates, representing provinces and municipalities, who entered. The winner would represent the Dominican Republic at Miss Universe 1992. The first runner up would enter Miss World 1992. The second runner up would enter in Miss International 1992. The rest of finalist entered different pageants.

Results

Delegates

External links
search Miss Republica Dominicana 1991

Miss Dominican Republic
1992 beauty pageants
1992 in the Dominican Republic